Con el cuerpo prestado (English: "With a Borrowed Body") is a 1983 Mexican fantasy comedy film directed by Tulio Demicheli and starring Sasha Montenegro and María Sorté.

Plot
Marta (Montenegro), a woman who tries to commit suicide, is saved by another, Carlota (Sorté), from drowning, but in preventing it Carlota herself dies drowned. After a while, Carlota returns in spirit to take possession of Marta's body and thus meet the man she loved in life.

Cast
 Sasha Montenegro as Marta Jiménez de Arias
 María Sorté as Carlota Beltrán
 Carlos Piñar as Roberto Arias Salgado
 Otto Sirgo as Guillermo 'Memo' Beltrán
 Juan Peláez as Antonio
 Ariadna Welter as Leonor Salgado de Arias
 Juan Luis Galiardo as Pedro
 María Montaño
 Jorge Patiño
 Mario Cid
 Rocío Chazaro
 Leopoldo Salazar (as Polo Salazar)
 Roberto Ballesteros
 Carlos Pouliot
 Patricia Durán
 Elsa de los Ríos
 Luz María Peña

Reception 
In her book Sara García: Ícono cinematográfico mexicano, abuela y lesbiana, Ileana Baeza Lope cites the film as one of the exceptions to the tendency in Mexican cinema of "affective relationships between women [being] relegated to the sidelines", while "male camaraderie relationships were in the foreground".

References

Bibliography
Amador, María Luisa; Ayala Blanco, Jorge. Cartelera cinematográfica, 1980-1989. UNAM, 2006.
Baeza Lope, Ileana. Sara García: Ícono cinematográfico mexicano, abuela y lesbiana. Argus-a Artes y Humanidades, 2018.

External links

1980s fantasy comedy films
Films about spirit possession
Films directed by Tulio Demicheli
Mexican fantasy comedy films
1983 comedy films
1983 films
1980s Spanish-language films
1980s Mexican films